Variations on a Theme from Carmen is a set of variations composed and performed by the Russian-American pianist Vladimir Horowitz.  They are based on the Gypsy Dance from Georges Bizet's opera Carmen (1875).

Background
Of Horowitz's many transcriptions, the Carmen Variations was the only work to remain in his repertoire throughout his career. He played the Variations from his earliest concerts in the 1920s, when he delighted his audiences with the "show stopping" encore, through to his golden jubilee season in 1978, over 50 years later. 

The main theme of the piece originates from the energetic Gypsy Dance from Act II of Bizet's opera Carmen ("Les tringles des sistres tintaient"), a theme that has been used by many for various other variations and transcriptions, including Moszkowski's Chanson Bohème de l'Opéra Carmen.

Horowitz wished the piece not to be published. He performed it in many concerts and showed it to a couple of friends and acquaintances, and even made a piano roll of the piece, but kept the score to himself.

Horowitz's audiences loved the Carmen Variations and he performed them frequently. Eventually, he tired of this, concluding that his audiences forgot the rest of the programme after the encore.

Analysis 

The piece begins with the basic unchanged theme in a rapid tempo, however, the mood soon turns playful but with an increasing technical demand on the pianist. Notes cascade from the upper register and rhythms become even wilder.

In the latter section, a variant of the theme is played in the lower register, providing a calmer and less hectic atmosphere, but this does not last.

After an intricate, chromatic scale passage, taking the form of a short cadenza, the music suddenly explodes into mayhem and Horowitz blows the main theme through the roof, showing huge virtuosity, power and a brilliant technique at the keyboard.  

The coda of the piece concludes with the usual Horowitz-Style interlocking octaves, taking the form of an ascending chromatic scale and a few final mighty chords, all versions of the variations contain this in some form or another. 

In these variations Horowitz displays the heights of his powers and technique.

Versions 
The piece changed over time. It is almost strictly a virtuoso showpiece, but as the years progressed, the variations became more sophisticated. Here are the five main versions of the piece:

1927
Horowitz's first recordings were on a piano roll for Welte and Sons in January 1927 and in 1928 for Duo-Art. Also in 1928 Horowitz made his first disc recording of the piece for Victor, taking five attempts before a satisfactory take was approved. Takes 1-3 were cut on 26 March and takes 4 and 5 on 2 April. Take 5 was chosen for issue and the others were destroyed. In these early performances we hear the youthful Horowitz's hasty fingers. Two further takes were made on 25 February 1930 but these were destroyed.

1947
There is a live recording from 1942 and a similar studios version recorded in 1947. There were not many changes from the 1928 version save that the "cadenza" was completely new.

1957
In the middle of his long retirement from the concert stage from 1953 until 1965, Horowitz considered a return in 1957 and worked on a new version of his Variations. This version was not just a flashy encore, but a full length concert piece. We see some new developments; the variations are more varied and the coda is almost completely new. Unfortunately he did not return to the stage to perform it and the recording was not released until after his death.

1968 
In 1965, Horowitz ended his retirement and began performing again. He soon brought back his Carmen Variations and the public heard it for the first time in nearly 20 years. Though this version contained some of the changes made in 1957, it had been restored to its usual encore form with little change from the 1947 version. Horowitz performed the piece at his famous television concert in 1968 on CBS, with some minor changes from the 1967 version, mostly alterations to the coda.

In 2009 a recording from 1967 was released with slight differences to the coda.

1978 

The last recording of the Carmen Variations occurred in February 1978 at Horowitz's televised White House concert, celebrating the 50th anniversary of his American debut. This version is similar to that of 1968 save for a few small alterations and addition of several items from the 1957 version including some of the coda.

In 1985 during the filming of The Last Romantic, Horowitz included a few bars.

Recordings

Horowitz's recordings

Recordings by other pianists

See also
 List of variations on a theme by another composer

References

External links 
[ Carmen Variations] at Allmusic
Horowitz performing his Carmen Variations in 1968 (YouTube)
Horowitz performing his Carmen Variations in 1978 (YouTube)

Vladimir Horowitz
Compositions for solo piano
Piano compositions in the 20th century
Variations
Composer tributes (classical music)